Augustine Ashley Grimes (born 2 August 1957) is an Irish former footballer. He played for Manchester United, Coventry City, Luton Town, Stoke City and Osasuna  (Spain). He won 18 caps for the Republic of Ireland and scored one goal, a long-range strike against Spain in a Euro 84 qualifier at Lansdowne Road in November 1982.

Career
On 8 March 1978 at Dalymount Park, Dublin, Grimes played in the first ever Republic of Ireland U21 game; he went on to win six under-21 caps, scoring two goals, both from penalty kicks. Grimes, who played as a defender and midfielder, began his career with junior side Villa United before joining Stella Maris Football club. He had a trial with Manchester United in August 1972, but returned to Bohemians. After a second trial, he joined Manchester United in March 1977 for £35,000.

Between 1977 and 1983, Grimes made 107 first-team appearances and scored 11 goals for Manchester United, where he won an FA Cup-winner's medal as a non-playing substitute in the 1983 final against Brighton. He subsequently joined Coventry City for a fee of £200,000. After only one season he moved to Luton Town where he made 117 appearances and scored 4 goals. In 1988, he won a League Cup winners medal, coming on a substitute and crossing the ball to set up Luton's last-minute winning goal as they achieved a shock 3–2 victory over Arsenal to secure the first major trophy in their history.

In 1989, he joined Osasuna, making his La Liga debut on 8 November 1989 against Celta Vigo. Grimes played 15 games for CA Osasuna in total before returning to England to play for Stoke City where he made 15 appearances in 1991–92.

He retired from playing in May 1992 and became youth team manager at Stoke and Celtic under Lou Macari and later at Huddersfield Town. He joined the coaching staff at Welsh side Colwyn Bay in February 2013.

Career statistics

Club
Sourced from 

A.  The "Other" column constitutes appearances and goals in the Full Members Cup, Football League Trophy, Football League play-offs, UEFA Cup and UEFA Cup Winners' Cup.

International
Source:

Honours
Bohemians
 League of Ireland (1): 1974–75
 League of Ireland Cup (1): 1974–75
 FAI Cup (1): 1975–76

Manchester United
 FA Cup (1): 1982–83

Luton Town
 Football League Cup (1): 1987–88
Stoke City
 Football League Trophy (1): 1991–92

References

External links
Ashley Grimes at Sporting Heroes

1957 births
Living people
Association football midfielders
Association football fullbacks
Republic of Ireland association footballers
Republic of Ireland international footballers
Republic of Ireland under-21 international footballers
Bohemian F.C. players
Manchester United F.C. players
Coventry City F.C. players
Luton Town F.C. players
Stoke City F.C. players
La Liga players
CA Osasuna players
Expatriate footballers in England
Irish expatriate sportspeople in England
Expatriate footballers in Spain
Irish expatriate sportspeople in Spain
Association footballers from Dublin (city)
League of Ireland players
Celtic F.C. non-playing staff
Huddersfield Town A.F.C. non-playing staff
English Football League players
Stella Maris F.C. players